Juniper Beach is a neighborhood of Louisville, Kentucky located on the Ohio River at River Road and Juniper Beach Road.

References

Neighborhoods in Louisville, Kentucky